Kim Dong-jin (born 29 January 1982) is a former South Korean footballer who played as a full-back or a wing-back. He is currently the assistant coach of Hong Kong Premier League club Kitchee.

Club career
Kim started his professional career in Anyang LG Cheetahs (FC Seoul before 2004) in 2000, and spent his prime with them before joining Zenit Saint Petersburg. On 28 June 2006, he transferred to Zenit, following coach Dick Advocaat and Korean teammate Lee Ho. During his second season in Zenit, he helped his team to achieve their first Russian Premier League title by showing outstanding performance, and was named the second best left-back of the Russian Football Union. However, he couldn't show his ability after suffering a leg injury in the middle of the next season. Furthermore, he had a sudden problem with the blood circulation of his brain, and Zenit finally terminated his contract on 26 January 2010. He moved to Ulsan Hyundai and FC Seoul after other medical check-ups that found he was healthy enough to play, but he couldn't settle there.

On 24 July 2019, Kim played Kitchee's friendly against Manchester City until being substituted in the 15th minute, and was handed a City shirt by Man City manager Pep Guardiola as strolling off the pitch. After the match, Kim retired from playing career, and became a coach of Kitchee.

International career
He was South Korea's left midfielder in the 2004 Summer Olympics, and helped Korea finish second in Group A by scoring one goal (against Greece) and two assists (both against Mali), consequently advancing to the next round. However, they were stopped by the silver medalist Paraguay.

In 2004, Kim's performance against Germany while under Jo Bonfrère secured him the left-back or left midfield position (depending on the formation that was usually 4–3–3 or 3–4–3), which originally belonged to Lee Young-pyo. However, as Advocaat became the new manager of South Korea in November 2005, both Lee and Kim had to compete for the position. Since the two players proved to be highly influential to the national team, both players were rotated for the left back position during 2006 FIFA World Cup.

During the 2008 Summer Olympics, he was summoned to join South Korean under-23 squad as an over-aged player. Despite his solid performance and a winning goal scored in the last game against Honduras, his team was eliminated in the first round.

Career statistics

Club

International
Results list South Korea's goal tally first.

Honours
FC Seoul
 K League 1: 2000
 Korean League Cup: 2006
 Korean Super Cup: 2001

Zenit Saint Petersburg
 UEFA Cup: 2007–08
 UEFA Super Cup: 2008
 Russian Premier League: 2007
 Russian Super Cup: 2008

Muangthong United
Thai FA Cup runner-up: 2015

Kitchee
Hong Kong Premier League: 2016–17, 2017–18
Hong Kong FA Cup: 2016–17, 2017–18
Hong Kong Senior Challenge Shield: 2016–17
Sapling Cup: 2017–18
Hong Kong Community Cup: 2017

South Korea U23
Asian Games bronze medal: 2002

South Korea
AFC Asian Cup third place: 2007
 EAFF Championship: 2003

Individual
 K League 1 Best XI: 2004

Notes

References

External links
 
 Kim Dong-jin – National Team Stats at KFA 
 
 
 

1982 births
Living people
Association football defenders
South Korean footballers
South Korean expatriate footballers
South Korea under-17 international footballers
South Korea under-20 international footballers
South Korea under-23 international footballers
South Korea international footballers
Zhejiang Professional F.C. players
FC Seoul players
Ulsan Hyundai FC players
FC Zenit Saint Petersburg players
UEFA Cup winning players
Kim Dong-jin
Seoul E-Land FC players
Kitchee SC players
Hoi King SA players
K League 1 players
K League 2 players
Russian Premier League players
Chinese Super League players
Kim Dong-jin
Expatriate footballers in China
Expatriate footballers in Russia
Expatriate footballers in Thailand
2006 FIFA World Cup players
2007 AFC Asian Cup players
2010 FIFA World Cup players
Footballers at the 2004 Summer Olympics
Footballers at the 2008 Summer Olympics
Olympic footballers of South Korea
Sportspeople from Gyeonggi Province
South Korean expatriate sportspeople in China
South Korean expatriate sportspeople in Russia
South Korean expatriate sportspeople in Thailand
South Korean expatriate sportspeople in Hong Kong
Asian Games medalists in football
Footballers at the 2002 Asian Games
Footballers at the 2006 Asian Games
Asian Games bronze medalists for South Korea
Medalists at the 2002 Asian Games
South Korean football managers
Expatriate football managers in Hong Kong
Kitchee SC managers